Lioptilodes tribonia is a species of moth in the genus Lioptilodes known from Chile and Peru. Moths of this species take flight in January and July and have a wingspan of approximately 15–16 millimetres.

References

Platyptiliini
Moths described in 1921